The 1952 Utah Redskins football team was an American football team that represented the University of Utah as a member of the Skyline Conference during the 1952 college football season. In their third season under head coach Jack Curtice, the Redskins compiled an overall record of 6–3–1 with a mark of 5–0 against conference opponents, winning Skyline title for the second consecutive year.

Schedule

After the season

NFL Draft
Utah had three players selected in the 1953 NFL Draft.

References

Utah
Utah Utes football seasons
Mountain States Conference football champion seasons
Utah Redskins football